The lex Atilia Marcia was a Roman law, introduced by the tribunes of the plebs Lucius Atilius and Gaius Marcius in 311 BC. The law empowered the people to elect 16 military tribunes for each of the four legions.

Background

The law was passed against a background of ongoing class struggle in Republican Rome. Prior to this legislation military tribunes had been selected rather than elected, the position being largely in the gift of the commanding magistrates, the dictator or the consuls.

Provisions

From 311 the 16 military tribunes were to be elected by popular vote.

A separate piece of legislation was also passed enforcing the election of the naval commissioners in charge of commissioning and refitting the fleet.

See also
Conflict of the Orders
List of Roman laws
Roman Law

References

Roman law
Reform in the Roman Republic
4th century BC in the Roman Republic